John A. Choi Jae-seon (January 7, 1912 – June 3, 2008) was a South Korean prelate of the Roman Catholic Church.

Jae-seon was born in Ulsan, South Korea, and was ordained a priest on June 11, 1938 in the  Diocese of Pusan. Jae-seon was appointed a vicar apostolic for the Diocese of Pusan as well as Titular Bishop of Fussala on January 26, 1957 and was ordained on May 26, 1957.  He was appointed bishop of Diocese of Pusan on March 10, 1962 but resigned on September 19, 1973 after being appointed Titular Bishop of Tanaramusa.

Jae-Seon died on June 3, 2008 at age of 96.

During the Vietnam War (1956-1975) he was known for giving Saint Christopher medals and Rosaries and giving them out to American G.I.s on R & R in Japan (also to GIs stationed as peacekeeping forces in South Korea).  The medals were inscribed with the veteran's initials.

It was erroneously believed that the Bishop gave out Saint Christopher medals during the Korean War but he wasn't a bishop until 1957 (4 years after the cease fire was signed).

See also
Diocese of Pusan

External links
Catholic-Hierarchy

1915 births
2008 deaths
20th-century Roman Catholic bishops in South Korea
Participants in the Second Vatican Council
Roman Catholic bishops of Busan